The 1997 International Tennis Championships was an ATP men's tennis tournament held in Coral Springs, Florida, United States that was part of the World Series of the 1997 ATP Tour. It was the fifth edition of the tournament and was held from May 5 to May 12, 1997. Fourth-seeded Jason Stoltenberg won his second consecutive singles title at the event.

Finals

Singles

 Jason Stoltenberg defeated  Jonas Björkman 6–0, 2–6, 7–5
 It was Stoltenberg's only singles title of the year and the 4th and last of his career.

Doubles

 Dave Randall /  'Greg Van Emburgh defeated  Luke Jensen /  Murphy Jensen 6–7, 6–2, 7–6
 It was Randall's only title of the year and the 3rd of his career. It was van Emburgh's only title of the year and the 6th of his career.

References

International Tennis Championships
International Tennis Championships
International Tennis Championships
International Tennis Championships
Delray Beach Open
Coral Springs, Florida